Santalpur railway station is a railway station in Patan district, Gujarat, India on the Western line of the Western Railway network. One Passenger, two Express, and one Superfast trains halt here.

Nearby stations 

Garmadi is the nearest railway station towards , whereas Chhansara is the nearest railway station towards .

Major trains 

The following Express and Superfast trains halt at Santalpur railway station in both directions:

 12959/60 Dadar–Bhuj Superfast Express
 19151/52 Palanpur–Bhuj Intercity Express
 14321/22 Ala Hazrat Express (via Bhildi)

References 

Railway stations in Patan district
Ahmedabad railway division